Mukkudi is a village in the Aranthangirevenue block of Pudukkottai district, Tamil Nadu, India.

Demographics 

As per the 2001 census, Mukkudi had a total population of 4800 with 2370 males and 2430 females. Out of the total population 2836 people were literate.

References

Villages in Pudukkottai district